is a former Japanese football player.

Playing career
Koyama was born in Tamba-Sasayama on December 27, 1982. After graduating from high school, he joined the J1 League club JEF United Ichihara in 2001. However he could hardly play in the match until 2003. In 2004, he moved to the Japan Football League club Otsuka Pharmaceutical (later Tokushima Vortis). Although he did not play at all, the club won the championship in 2004 and was promoted to the J2 League in 2005. He played many matches from 2005 and became a regular player as a left side midfielder in 2007. However he did not play as much summer 2007 and played less in 2008. In 2009, he moved to his local club, the Banditonce Kakogawa in the Regional Leagues. He played often over three seasons and retired at the end of the 2011 season.

Club statistics

References

External links

1982 births
Living people
Association football people from Hyōgo Prefecture
Japanese footballers
J1 League players
J2 League players
Japan Football League players
JEF United Chiba players
Tokushima Vortis players
Association football midfielders